"Powerglide" is a single by American hip hop duo Rae Sremmurd. It was released on March 1, 2018 by EarDrummers and Interscope Records as the third single from their third studio album SR3MM (2018). The song is written by the artists alongside producers Mally Mall, Jean-Marie Horvat, and Mike Will Made It. The song features guest vocals from American rapper Juicy J (although he is notably cut from the radio edit).

Background
The song was released alongside two other singles from SR3MM, Swae Lee's "Hurt to Look" and Slim Jxmmi's "Brxnks Truck", on March 1, 2018. The album is a triple-disc album featuring SR3MM and solo albums from Rae Sremmurd members Swae Lee, titled Swaecation, and Slim Jxmmi, titled Jxmtro. The song samples Three 6 Mafia's "Side 2 Side", featuring Mafia member Juicy J. They were able to get Juicy J involved after a run-in at a party. Juicy expressed an interest in collaboration and went to the studio. He sent his part back, and as Swae says, "wrecked it."

Music video
A music video for "Powerglide" was released on March 12, 2018. In the visual, the rappers perform the track up on a parking structure rooftop as cars burn rubber, do donuts and get "lit up" by overhead helicopters. Producer Mike Will Made It makes a cameo appearance in the video.

Personnel
Credits adapted from Tidal.

 Khalif Brown – composition
 Aaquil Brown – composition
 Jordan Houston – composition
 Jamal Rashid – composition, production
 Jean-Marie Horvat – composition, production
 Michael Williams – composition, production, mixing
 Jaycen Joshua – mixing

Charts

Weekly charts

Year-end charts

Certifications

References

2018 songs
2018 singles
Rae Sremmurd songs
Interscope Records singles
Songs written by Swae Lee
Songs written by Juicy J
Song recordings produced by Mike Will Made It
Songs written by Slim Jxmmi
Songs written by Mike Will Made It
Songs written by Mally Mall